The Cambridge Institute for Sustainability Leadership, formerly the Cambridge Programme for Sustainability Leadership and the Cambridge Programme for Industry, is part of the School of Technology within the University of Cambridge.

The Institute works with leaders to tackle critical global challenges through action research, convening business groups and executive education.  Polly Courtice is Director of the Institute and was made a Dame in the 2016 Queen's 2016 Birthday Honours for services to sustainability leadership. The Prince of Wales is its patron.

In 2015 the Institute launched its Rewiring the Economy framework setting out ten collaborative tasks for business, policy and finance leaders to lay the foundations for a sustainable global economy.

The Institute has over 16,000 alumni from its executive and graduate education for sustainability leadership and a network of companies that belong to its Leaders Groups. The Institute is governed by a Management Board and an Advisory Board and has Fellows and Senior Associates from across academia and business who are involved with programme design and delivery, research and work with business leaders groups.

Graduate Education

Postgraduate Certificate In Sustainable Business
The Postgraduate Certificate in Sustainable Business is a Masters-level programme from the University of Cambridge. It is designed to help senior and mid-career managers to develop corporate strategies to embed the principles of sustainability into their organisations and to identify new opportunities for sustainable business practice. The Programme spans an 8-month period (part-time) and is built around:

 Three short workshops held in Cambridge
 Individual work-based assignments
 A group research project around an area of mutual relevance

Postgraduate Certificate in Sustainable Value Chains
The Postgraduate Certificate in Sustainable Value Chains is a Master's-level accredited programme from the University of Cambridge.

 Two x four-day residential workshops
 Two x Individual work-based assignments - one situational analysis, the other change action planning
 A group research project around an area of mutual relevance

Master of Studies in Sustainability Leadership
The Master of Studies in Sustainability Leadership is an accredited University of Cambridge postgraduate degree. It is delivered on a part-time basis over 2 years; hence participants can continue in full-time employment and do not need to be UK-based. This interdisciplinary Masters is offered in association with the Departments of Architecture, Engineering, Geography, Land Economy and the Judge Business School. These Departments all deliver full-time sustainability-related postgraduate degrees.

Interdisciplinary Design for the Built Environment
The Master of Studies in Interdisciplinary Design for the Built Environment (IDBE) was originally administered by the Cambridge Programme for Industry from its inception in 1994; after 20 years of being led by the Departments of Architecture and of Engineering it reverted to CISL in 2017. IDBE was established following a seminar to discuss Education for the Built Environment held at Madingley Hall in September 1991, sponsored by The Ove Arup Foundation and organised by the Cambridge Programme for Industry. The seminar was attended by senior industry figures from architecture and engineering consultancies, from contracting firms and from developers, together with senior representatives from various academic institutions. The University of Cambridge was invited to create the programme and the first cohort of students started in 1994.

IDBE Origins
IDBE has its origins in the ideas of Ove Arup, an Anglo-Danish civil and structural engineer who founded a leading international engineering consultancy under his own name. Throughout the latter half of his career, Arup wrote extensively about his passion for 'total design' and the need for improved and more effective collaboration between engineers and architects, his experiences over intellectual property in the case of Sydney Opera House being formative (see for example ). Arup's RIBA Royal Gold Medal address and his Key Speech are summaries of many of his ideas.

After Arup's death in 1988, the leaders of the consulting firm established The Ove Arup Foundation in his memory, and its objectives included an emphasis on the multi-disciplinary nature of design in engineering and architecture. The Foundation Trustees perceived a need for an initiative to bring professionals in the built environment together to study with a set of common objectives, and supported by leading academics and industry practitioners. A key concern of Sir Jack Zunz was to produce graduates who could engage with civil servants and policy makers at the highest level of government. He felt that the narrowness of engineering education in particular was a real impediment to this. In this way, the learning experience would not be limited to technical disciplines but extended across the humanities to broaden the participants’ outlook. An initial proposal was made in the summer of 1989 by Sir Jack Zunz to Professor Peter Carolin, Head of the Department of Architecture at Cambridge, and Professor Jacques Heyman, Head of the Department of Engineering for an interdisciplinary summer school but the idea coincided with the Prince of Wales announcing his own summer school and was dropped.

Subsequently, the ideas were examined at a seminar at Madingley Hall in Cambridge held in September 1991 at which senior figures from industry and academic discussed how to improve Education for the Built Environment and how to create a programme devised by the industry, and for the industry. Several higher education establishments were invited to put forward expressions of interest for establishing such a programme and there were proposals for collaboration between universities to create the course.

Cambridge's proposal was largely constructed by Professor Peter Carolin, then head of the Department of Architecture, and Dr Robin Spence, a lecturer in structural engineering in the Department and former employee at Arup. Approval was gained from Professor Alec Broers, then Head of the Department of Engineering. After a selection process, the Foundation agreed to support the Cambridge proposal. The trustees responsible for initiating the course were Sir Jack Zunz, Sir Philip Dowson, Ronald Hobbs and Povl Ahm.

Supported by the Cambridge Programme for Industry (now the Cambridge Institute for Sustainability Leadership), the IDBE academic content was to be delivered by the Department of Architecture, University of Cambridge and the Department of Engineering, University of Cambridge acting collaboratively.

Dr Robin Spence was appointed the first Course Director. He was supported by an Architect, Giles Oliver, and a Building Services Engineer, Paul Kirby appointed as joint course co-ordinators forming the academic delivery team. The first cohort of students were admitted in July 1994. It was the first part-time course at Cambridge, and it was only after the first cohort of students had started that the University confirmed their eligibility for a masters level qualification.

Aims of the IDBE programme
The aims of the course were established as to provide its graduates with a broad strategic understanding of the social, economic and environmental context of design, and of the challenges and opportunities facing the production of the built environment. It was intended to equip its students with the skills needed to create buildings, spaces and neighbourhoods that are visually attractive, supportive of social activities, ecologically friendly and economically viable. The course emphasises strategic decision making, inventive problem solving, team leadership, innovation and interdisciplinary collaboration.

Coincidence of purpose of IDBE with contemporary Government initiatives
The early years of the course coincided with the publication of major reviews of the construction industry, the first Constructing the Team by the committee chaired by Sir Michael Latham (which commended the establishment of the course, page 73), and the second Rethinking Construction by the committee led by Sir John Egan (industrialist). Many of the ideas in both reports were entirely compatible with the objectives of the course, and in its early years IDBE helped to deliver the ‘rethinking construction’ agenda to professionals taking the course. Initiatives led by government and by industry and research undertaken by academia have always been influential in the course content which has evolved continuously to ensure it represents the latest thinking across the sector.

IDBE course content
Course content includes but is not limited to environmental issues like global climate change, energy efficiency, eco-building, zero-carbon, and biodiversity; social issues such as the impact of the built environment on health, productivity and well-being; urban design issues such as civic pride, sense of place, and projects that support neighbourly behaviour; technical innovations such as off-site construction, intelligent buildings, smart cities and urban futures; buildings and places as cultural artifacts and how to protect, conserve and retrofit them; and project process innovations such as performance indicators, co-location, BIM, cost-led procurement and open-book working. Evening horizon lectures on non-built environment topics contribute towards the ambition that course graduates learn about government and policy making.

IDBE accreditation by the professional institutions
The master's course is accredited as Further Learning by the Joint Board of Moderators on behalf of the Institution of Civil Engineers, the Institution of Structural Engineers, the Chartered Institution of Highways and Transportation and the Institute of Highway Engineers. It is also accredited for Further Learning by the Chartered Institution of Building Services Engineers. It is accredited by the Royal Institution of Chartered Surveyors through the project management pathway, and is recognised as a provider of Advanced Continuing Professional Development by the Royal Institute of British Architects.

IDBE course recruitment and student numbers
By 2019, about 400 students had been admitted to the programme, of whom about one-third were engineers (civil, structural and buildings services typically) about one-third architects, and about one-third from related disciplines including but not limited to project management, surveying, design management, urban planning, and environmental assessment. Of these, over 300 had gained the Master's qualification, with about 20 being awarded the lesser qualification of IDBE Post-Graduate Diploma. Many of those from the early years of the course have gone on to hold senior positions.

Studying on the IDBE master's course
Students taking the course become members of Wolfson College, Cambridge. They formerly spent seven separate residential weeks in Cambridge (six weeks from 2017) at Wolfson at approximately three to four month intervals; teaching typically takes place in the University Department of Architecture and/or the Department of Engineering. Each of the residential weeks has a technical theme around which the week is based. Typically there are lectures and workshops in the morning, while afternoons are devoted to group projects undertaken in small mixed discipline teams whose membership changes through the residential weeks. The group projects help to support peer-to-peer learning, as well as experiential learning since the teams are expected to deliver a design proposition. The outputs expected from the teams are specified and might be a physical model, a set of freehand sketches and calculations, a powerpoint presentation, a video, and so on. At the end of each residential week, the group project outputs are reviewed by the Course Director with one or more external specialists.

Between the residential weeks spent in Cambridge, students work on individual assignments. The assignments are progressive and involve three in the first year: 1) a case study of a project in which they reflect on success or otherwise of the project and their contribution and that of other participants; 2) a formal literature review of a topic within the course syllabus; 3) a mini-research study that encourages them to collect and analyse new evidence or data so as to answer one or more research questions. The first year projects develop the vital writing and research skills that are needed to complete a masters level thesis of 12,000-15,000 words in the second year.

Soft skills
The former middle residential week of the course, week 4 out of 7, comprised a series of workshops and seminars about so-called soft skills. These skills are essential in the modern workplace where ensuring clients and colleagues are responsive to well-marshalled factual evidence requires interpersonal skills and insights to convey and persuade through strength of argument, interpersonal skills and insights into their perspectives. The middle week included role-play activities and interactive sessions delivered by specialist management trainers, and covering: effective presentation and communication skills, personality types (including Myers-Briggs Type Indicator assessment), negotiation skills, team roles including the ideas of Meredith Belbin, leadership styles, organisational types and organisational change, and working with the media. After 2017, the contents of this week was spread through across the remaining six residential weeks.

Research and writing skills
There is considerable emphasis on helping students to develop skills in evidence-based reasoning and writing. An introductory visit to Cambridge University Library is provided in the first week of the course and includes a session on locating books and other sources, and using on-line systems effectively. Students mainly use the libraries of the Engineering and Architecture Departments, and their respective librarians provide induction courses to the cataloguing systems and on-line facilities as well as on-going support as required. Lectures and workshops run through the course to help develop expertise in: identifying and accessing current knowledge from diverse sources including academic journals; analysing and reviewing literature sources critically; identifying gaps and challenges that warrant investigation; framing appropriate research questions that address one or more gaps in knowledge; designing an enquiry to enable the questions to be answered; gathering evidence or data and analysing it to identify patterns and implications; reporting the findings and answering the research questions; drawing conclusions; potentially making recommendations; and being aware of limitations.

Attending RIBA Research Symposia 2007-2011
The Course Director from 2006 to 2017, Dr Macmillan, also chaired the RIBA Research and Innovation Committee from 2007-2012. The Committee organised annual Research Symposia that were built into the first residential week of the IDBE course - giving IDBE students the opportunity to visit the RIBA headquarters as well as participate in the latest thinking in architectural research. The Symposia attended were: 2007 Reflections on Practice; 2008 Space at Home; 2009 Changing Practices; 2010 Does Beauty Matter; 2011 The Shrinking World.

Other conferences
Other conferences built into the course included: March 2009 - Building Physics Conference, held in the Department of Engineering; September 2012 - Centenary of the Department of Architecture 1912-2012, held at Clare College; September 2015 - Cambridge Workshop on Energy, Transport and Urban Infrastructure, held in the Department of Engineering.

IDBE debates held at the Cambridge Union 2011-2015
Four IDBE debates took place at The Cambridge Union:
December 2011, held jointly with the Construction Engineering Masters programme: 'This House believes that low carbon buildings are unaffordable' (defeated).
December 2012, held jointly with the Construction Engineering Masters programme: Motion: 'This House believes that regulation stifles innovation’ (defeated).
December 2013 held jointly with The Edge. Motion: 'This House believes that BIM is the answer' (won).
December 2015, held jointly with Laing O’Rourke Graduate Training. Motion: 'This House believes that competition is the best spur to innovation’ (defeated).

Royal Academy of Engineering Visiting Teaching Fellow
Tanya de Hoog (Cohort 12) was appointed as Royal Academy of Engineering Visiting Teaching Fellow for 2012, and continues to lecture from time to time.

The student journey through the course
Through its lectures, workshops, seminars and group projects, the master's course takes its students on several personal journeys, for example in spatial scale from the room to the building to the neighbourhood to the city; and from self-reflection about their role in a project to personality types, how to work effectively within a team, project leadership skills, organisation types, and on to the role of professions within society and questions of professional ethics.

IDBE Event 1995: Redefining the Design Team
A discussion meeting was held on 16 October 1995 at the Royal Academy of Arts attended by over 60 leading industry delegates from consultancy and academia to discuss 'redefining the design team'. Papers were given by Ian Ritchie, Sir Alan Cockshaw, Peter Rogers and Sir Jack Zunz, and an overview of the first year of the course and the first two cohorts recruited was presented by Giles Oliver.

IDBE Event 1997: The design professions in transition
An all day conference was held in the new Queen's Building at Emmanuel College on 12 September 1997. The event was opened by John Martin, Chairman of the Trustees of The Ove Arup Foundation. Speakers included Dean Hawkes, Richard Saxon, former Chairman of Building Design Partnership, Michael Dickson (engineer), founding partner of Buro Happold, Sam Price, James Burland, plus IDBE graduate Graeme Jennings, and IDBE student Sophie le Bourva.

IDBE Symposium 2010
An evening symposium was held on 25 March 2010 at the Building Centre in London. Sebastian Macmillan welcomed about 250 alumni and guests, and gave a short overview of the course and its objectives. The keynote talk was by Chris Luebkeman, Director of Global Foresight and Innovation at Arup, under the heading 2050 - the world we think we knew. This was followed by a Panel Discussion, whose members were engineer and alumna Fiona Cobb of Price and Myers; planner Esther Kurland; Michael Dickson and Richard Saxon.

IDBE@20
In 2014, IDBE celebrated its 20th anniversary with an event at Wolfson College. This comprised presentations and a panel discussion focusing on whether the sector has become more interdisciplinary over the last 20 years, and where we should go from here. The panellists were: representing the professions, Sunand Prasad, past President of the RIBA; representing industry, Sophie Le Bourva, Arup Associate and alumna from the IDBE Cohort 2; and representing academia and training, Professor Peter Guthrie, Professor of Sustainable Development at Cambridge University. The event was attended by alumni, past and present course staff, tutors and associates, and members of the course management committee.

IDBE alumni
Many graduates of the course are in senior positions within engineering and architectural consultancies, and working elsewhere in built environment related professions. For example, graduates can be found working as senior engineers in major consultancies including Arup (about 37), Buro Happold (15), WSP (5), AECOM (3), plus Atkins, Ramboll, Mott MacDonald, Bechtel, Price & Myers, and Pick Everard. Andrew Watts (Cohort 2) is principal of Newtecnic, a specialist facade consultancy. Trevor Butler (Cohort 4) formed Archineers, consultancy that bridges between architecture and engineering. Fiona Cobb (Cohort 10) is author of The Structural Engineers Pocket book and founding director of Cobb & Company. Clive Fussell (Cohort 6) and Paul Grimes (Cohort 11) formed the engineering consultancy Engenuiti together. Tanya de Hoog (Cohort 12) is a founding director of Thornton Thomasetti's London office. Andy Nicholson (Cohort 13) founded the Fire Surgery. Some are with contractors. Similarly a number of graduates are in senior positions in architectural practices such as Stephen Herbert (Cohort 13), Vice President of HOK in London, and several are principals of their own practices, such as Vikram Lall (Cohort 5). A relatively small number work in the public sector. A number of graduates have taken up academic posts such as Tom Barker (designer) (Cohort 1), Gerrard Wood (Cohort 2), and Jennifer Barrett (Cohort 10). Professor David Richards of Southampton University was already professor of civil engineering when he joined Cohort 16). Dr Kerry Mashford (Cohort 6) is Chief Executive of the National Energy Foundation. Paul Ravenhall (IDBE 7).

Several alumni have been featured in journals, including Ken Hannah in Construction Manager (April 2005) and Mark Key also in Construction Manager, (March 2008). Building Magazine's Top 50 Rising Stars of Sustainability in March 2012 included not less than three IDBErs: Alasdair Young, Holly Knight and Clive Fussell.

Research and publication: a knowledge hub
IDBE successfully established itself as a research centre and a knowledge hub. In the early years of the course, funding was won from the Engineering and Physical Sciences Research Council for two research projects: Achieving Quality through Interdisciplinary Teamwork (AQIT and a follow-on project AQIT-2) and Mapping the Design Process during the conceptual phase of building projects. AQIT led to various academic papers on teamwork, together with the booklet Effective Teamwork - a good practice guide for the construction industry  and a case study Partnering workshops to promote teamwork in the construction of Oakfields Primary School. There was coverage in the professional and technical press. Mapping the Design Process also led to a variety of outputs in the academic press and beyond.

In 2001, an edited book was published bringing together some of the most influential material delivered on the course under the title Interdisciplinary Design in Practice.

Course Director from 2006-2017, Dr Sebastian Macmillan, undertook a number of research projects connected with the themes of the IDBE course. They include: 1) The Value Handbook, for the Commission for Architecture and the Built Environment (now part of the Design Council); 2) Sustainable Buildings Need Integrated Teams, a report for the Specialist Engineering Alliance; 3) Construction Abu Dhabi 2030: building on solid foundations, a major but confidential review of the construction industry in Abu Dhabi undertaken in 2009 4) Funding low carbon buildings through project process innovations, a report for the Construction Industry Council and the Royal Institute of British Architects 5) Health Technical Memorandum 07-02 Making Energy Work in Healthcare (Parts A and B).

A number of graduates turned their individual course assignments into conference papers. For example:
	Martin Watson of Brock Carmichael gave an award-winning presentation at the 10th Chinese Urban Housing Conference in Shanghai
	Martin Watson and Tessa Brunette gave a paper to the XXV International Union of Architects World Congress in Durban, August 2014 on the subject of Arkwright Town and the Eldonians: evaluation of socio-economic and psychological aspects of two displaced communities in the United Kingdom.
	Cham Ariyaratne turned her IDBE thesis into a paper to the International Conference on Sustainabilility in Energy and Buildings (SEB-14) Cardiff, June 2014 and it was later published in Energy Procedia.
	Paolo Perugini gave a paper on Pier Luigi Nervi's Columns: Flow of Lines and Forces published in the proceedings.
	Laila Mehrpour's thesis was turned into a paper for the 2013 World Building Congress in Brisbane
	Mark Key developed his IDBE thesis into the book masonry construction.
	Matt Cousins developed his IDBE thesis into a book on design quality.
	Graham Gidney published a paper based on his thesis in Health Estate.

A review of a sample of student case studies was presented at the 2013 World Building Congress in Brisbane under the title Exploring Critical Success Factors in multi-organisational design and construction projects

For a period up to 2014, top graded theses were available on the course website together with examples of the group studio design project work.

Articles about the IDBE course
	Spence R, Kirby P and Oliver G (1994) 'Interdisciplinary design - a new approach to postgraduate professional education', The Structural Engineer, vol 72, no 22,pp 382–383, 15 November 1994.
	Kirby P and Spence R (1996) 'Birth of the all-round construction designer', Proceedings of the Institution of Civil Engineers - Civil Engineering, vol 114, no 1, pp 46–48, February 1996.
	Rea T (1997) 'Passion and collaboration needed', M&E Design, pp 13–14, November 1997.
	Jupp J and Macmillan S (2010) 'Promoting teamwork and sustainable design', The Structural Engineer, vol 88, no 2, pp 16–18, 19 January 2010.

Equivalent design courses elsewhere
Hong Kong. The Ove Arup Foundation established a similar course to IDBE hosted by the Department of Architecture at Hong Kong University, under the title Master of Science in Interdisciplinary Design & Management (MIDM). Greg Pearce was appointed as the Programme Director, with Chris Cowell as the Programme Co-ordinator. It too recruited annually, was of two years duration, and dealt with similar themes but with a specific emphasis on the challenges facing Asian cities and buildings. The first cohort started in 2003. It was noted as a high quality course by ACBEE (Accelerating Change in Built Environment Education). At the time of writing (March 2017) it had evolved into the Master of Science in Integrated Project Delivery (IPD).

Harvard. Harvard Graduate School of Design (GSD) offers a course entitled Interdisciplinary Design in Practice  led by Instructor Hanif Kara. He and Andreas Georgoulias published a book in 2013 entitled Interdisciplinary Design: new lessons from Architecture and Engineering, Actar Publishing. The course is aimed at students from the GSD, and MIT.

MIT. In 2015, MIT launched a masters course on integrated design and management targeted at early-to-mid-career professionals. It is geared toward students who plan to pursue careers at the intersection of business, engineering, and design. It is offered by the School of Engineering and the Sloane School of Management.

London School of Economics. LSE planned a design-led programme on cities from the early 1990s. With support from The Ove Arup Foundation, the LSE Cities Programme was started with the appointment of Ricky Burdett as Programme Director in September 1996, and with a plan to launch a masters course from 1998. There was collaboration with the Cambridge IDBE team. Today (March 2017) the MSc in City Design and Social Science is part of the well-established LSE Cities Programme.

Oxford. Oxford University's MSc in Sustainable Urban Development was launched in 2009. The programme comprises eight intensive residential weeks across two years, generally held at Oxford's Department for Continuing Education. Like IDBE, the course is delivered through seminars, site visits, research workshop and individual tutorials. Contributors include university academics, industry experts and urban practitioners. A 15,000 word thesis is expected in the second year.

Executive Education

The Prince of Wales's Business & Sustainability Programme
The Prince of Wales's Business & Sustainability Programme was established in 1994 by The Prince of Wales and the University of Cambridge.

Sustainability Leadership Programme for the Health Care Sector
Together with the NHS Sustainable Development Unit for England the Institute runs a Sustainability Leadership Programme for the Health Care Sector. This two-day event with cohorts of 36 senior participants provides workshops, master classes and networks for health sector leaders internationally.

Cambridge Sustainability Practitioner Programme (South Africa)
The Cambridge Sustainability Practitioner Programme has been run from CISL's Cape Town office in South Africa since 2004, and aims to enable managers in the private or public sector to influence and guide their organisation in the direction of an integrated approach to sustainability across all functions.

Online learning

The Business & Sustainability Programme Online
The Business & Sustainability Programme Online  is an interactive programme designed for mid-career, high-potential and senior managers to enable them to understand the fundamentals of sustainability, how sustainability is relevant to their role and its importance to business success. It is also suitable for sustainability professionals who would like to refresh their knowledge.

Leaders groups 
Leaders groups are business-led initiatives, convening business leaders within and across sectors to tackle sustainability issues that they could not solve alone. The current leaders groups are managed under three themes: low carbon transformation, sustainable finance and natural resource security:

 Prince of Wales's Corporate Leaders Group
 Natural Capital Leaders Platform
 ClimateWise – the insurance industry
 The Banking and Environment Initiative
 Investment Leaders Group

References

External links 
 Guardian article on Rewiring the Economy
 Observer article on P8
 Reuters article on the Cancún Communiqué 
 BizCommunity article on the Cancún Communiqué
 Physorg article on the Cancún Communiqué

Sustainability Leadership, Institute for
Educational institutions established in 1989
1989 establishments in England